The Polish Motor Union (PZM) determined Polish riders to World and European Championships in several domestic qualifications meetings.

Grand Prix

European Championship 

Main Commission of Speedway Sport nominated eight riders to championships:
Qualifying Round One - Mureck
(Draw 6) Rafał Trojanowski
(13) Robert Miśkowiak
Qualifying Round Two - Diedenbergen
(4) Adrian Gomólski
(13) Michał Szczepaniak
Semi-Final One - Ljubljana
(5) Szymon Kiełbasa
(16) Sebastian Ułamek
Semi-Final Two - Balakovo
(10) Dawid Stachyra
Semi-Final Three - Berghaupten
(3) Sławomir Musielak

Under-21 World Championship

Under-19 European Championship 

3 May 2010
 Rawicz, Greater Poland Voivodeship
Florian Kapała Stadium (Length: 330 m)
Referee: Leszek Dembski
Beat Time: 61.37 - Patryk Dudek in Heat 7
Attendance: 50
References: 

Przemysław Pawlicki is a defending Under-19 European Champion. Maciej Janowski (draw 7) after crashed on 1 May in Ekstraliga match (Wrocław vs. Leszno) decided about resigned from this competitions. and was replaced by Łukasz Cyran. Janowski was second in 2009 championship. Patryk Dudek was started in last year European final also (was fifth), and Kacper Gomólski was track reserve.

Kociemba crashed Woźniak in Heat 2. Kociemba was replaced by reserve 18, and Woźniak was replaced by reserve 17. Reserve 17 was ride in Heat 1 also, replaced rider 1.

See also 
 2010 in sports
 Speedway in Poland

References 

!